Stouffer's is a brand of frozen prepared foods currently owned by Nestlé. Its products are available in the United States and Canada. Stouffer's is known for such popular fare as lasagna, macaroni and cheese, meatloaf, ravioli, and salisbury steak. It also produces a line of reduced-fat products under the Lean Cuisine brand name. In February 2023, Nestle Canada announced their intentions to wind down and exit the frozen meals and pizza business within the next six months.

History 
The Stouffer family business traces its roots to 1898, when James B. Stouffer and his son Abraham E. Stouffer started the Cottage Creamery Company at the Sheriff Street Market in Cleveland. In 1901, James's son Abraham E. Stouffer (age 26) became vice-president of the company. 

In 1905, the Stouffer family established the Medina County Creamery Company in Medina, Ohio.

James B. Stouffer died on November 23, 1908, at age 62 in Orlando, Florida, and Abraham took over the running of the Medina County Creamery.
 
On January 11, 1912, the Medina County Creamery Company filed a change of address to Cleveland. By 1914, the company had expanded and opened a branch of the Medina County Creamery Company in Detroit. By the mid-1910s, the creamery claimed to be the largest manufacturer and wholesaler of creamery products in the city of Cleveland, supplied by over 1,500 farmers. 

In early 1920, Stouffer's lucrative creamery drew the attention of the Fairmont Creamery (now Fairmont Foods), the largest creamery company in the United States. In December 1920, Abraham Stouffer announced that the Medina County Creamery Company would merge with Fairmont Creamery Company of Omaha, Nebraska through stock ownership. As part of the merger, Abraham Stouffer would oversee the Cleveland plant until 1922.

In 1922, Abraham Stouffer and his wife Lena Mahala Bigelow took over one of the company's milk stands, on the lower level of the Cleveland Arcade, and converted it into a restaurant serving buttermilk, sandwiches, and Lena Stouffer's homemade Dutch apple pie (credited by some as the reason for the almost instant success of the restaurant).

Abraham had reportedly had the idea for the "Stouffer Lunch System" before 1920. They opened the first restaurant, called the Stouffer Lunch, in 1924. As time went on, the couple continued the program of expansion with the assistance of their sons Vernon, a graduate of the Wharton School of Finance, and Gordon, who together led the reorganization of the business, taking it public as the Stouffer Corporation in 1929 with Abraham as chairman of the board.

The year 1929 also marked the beginning of the company's effort to establish locations outside of Ohio, with the opening of a restaurant in Detroit, Michigan, and another in Pittsburgh, Pennsylvania. After Abraham's death in 1936 the company continued its program of expansion by opening its first restaurant in New York City, and eventually began a program of diversification, entering the frozen food business in 1946. In 1956 the company was formally renamed Stouffer Foods Corporation.

In 1960 Stouffer purchased its first hotel, the Anacapri Inn of Fort Lauderdale, Florida, and, by the end of that year, the company was composed of three divisions: Stouffer Foods Corporation, Stouffer Hotels Corporation, and Stouffer Restaurants Corporation. In 1961, Stouffer's opened two short-lived automated vending restaurants.
Stouffer's took over this complex of restaurants with the shared kitchen (Plaza Pavilion). In 1962 Stouffer's Disneyland operated the Plaza Pavilion Restaurant, the Tahitian Terrace, and the French Market Restaurant. As of 2007, Stouffer's operated the Liberty Tree Tavern in Walt Disney World's Liberty Square.

In 1967, the Stouffer Corporation was purchased by Litton Industries for vertical integration purposes, when that company had a large share of the microwave oven market, but in 1973, Litton sold Stouffer to Nestlé. In 1993, as part of a refocusing of the company on food products, Nestlé announced its intention to sell Stouffer Hotels to the New World Development Company (which at that time owned the Renaissance and Ramada hotel brands). The transaction was complete, and the Stouffer Hotel brand was retired, by the end of 1996. Some Stouffer's Restaurants are now Select Restaurants.

Legal dealings
In 1991, the Federal Trade Commission issued a complaint that Stouffer Foods had misrepresented sodium content in their Lean Cuisine entrees by stating that they were low in sodium. Stouffer's argued that the campaign had focused on good taste and controlled sodium, fat, and calories. They also argued that the sodium claim was relative, reflecting a lower amount of sodium, not necessarily that the entrees were low sodium. However, the Administrative Law Judge ruled in favor of the Federal Trade Commission.

In 2003, Applebee's sued Stouffer's for a 1997 trademark infringement of Applebee's marketing term "Skillet Sensations." Applebee's had a line of "Skillet Sensations" of their own and claimed that it caused confusion for customers that believed the Stouffer's line was linked to theirs. The U.S. Trademark Trial and Appeal Board ruled in favor of Applebee's.

On March 14, 2011, a recall was placed on Lean Cuisine spaghetti and meatballs after consumers reported finding pieces of plastic in their meals. On March 10, 2016, a number of Stouffer's products were voluntarily recalled on the suspicion that they contained small pieces of glass.

References

External links

 
 "Stouffer Corporation"—History at Ohio History Central
 "Stouffer Foods" at the Encyclopedia of Cleveland History

1922 establishments in Ohio
Companies based in Cleveland
Food and drink companies established in 1922
Frozen food brands
Nestlé brands
Restaurants established in 1922